"Gazzillion Ear" is a single released by British-American hip hop artist DOOM through British independent label Lex Records. It contains the main single produced by J Dilla and remixes of the track.

Track listing

CD single

12" vinyl single

A-side

B-side

Sample credits
"The.Green.Whore.Net." samples the theme song and dialogue from the 1960s ABC TV serial The Green Hornet.

References

2010 EPs
MF Doom albums